Capitol Latin (formerly EMI Latin) is a brand of Universal Music Latin Entertainment, a division of Universal Music Group. Previously, it was a subsidiary of EMI.

History 
In 1989, José Behar, the former head of CBS Discos, signed Selena to EMI Latin, because he thought he had discovered the next Gloria Estéfan.

In 1990, EMI Latin acquired San Antonio, TX-based Cara Records in order to capitalize on the popularity of Tejano. Artists under the Cara label included Mazz, David Lee Garza, and La Mafia.

Popular EMI Latin performers linked to the EMI Televisa Music and Televisa networks included Thalía, Pedro Fernández, RBD, María Daniela y su Sonido Lasser, and Kudai. The label also signed reggaeton artists like DJ Flex and Tito El Bambino.

In 2009, EMI Latin ended its partnership with Televisa, moved from Miami, to Los Angeles, and was renamed Capitol Latin. After Universal Music Group's acquisition of EMI in 2012, Capitol Latin merged with Universal Music Latin Entertainment. The Capitol Latin record label is now a brand of Universal Music Latin Entertainment division and continues to be distributed by Universal Music Group.

Label artists
The following is a select list of artists currently or previously signed to the label:

A. B. Quintanilla
Alberto Plaza
Alejandra Guzmán
Aleks Syntek
Álvaro Torres
Amaral
Aracely Arámbula
Babasónicos
Barrio Boyzz
Bebe
Belinda
Big Circo
Bunbury
Cabas
Carlos Ponce
Carlos Vives
Catupecu Machu
Charly García
Christian Chávez
Chuy Jr. y sus Jardineros
Cuba 21
Daniela Romo
Daddy Yankee
Diana Reyes
DJ Kane
Domino Saints
Eiza González
El Gran Silencio
El Momento
Fey
Guatauba
Haydée
Jaguares
Jailene Cintrón
Intocable
J Balvin
JD Natasha
Joey Montana
Johnny Hernández
Juan Luis Guerra
Kumbia Kings
La Mosca Tse Tse
La Onda
Laura Canales
Limi-T 21
Los Auténticos Decadentes
Los Caudillos Del Norte
Los Claxons
Los Invasores de Nuevo León
Los Mismos
Los Nocheros
Los Originales de San Juan
Los Parientes
Los Payasónicos
Los Traileros del Norte
Lunna
Martina Stoessel
Mazz
Miranda!
Moderatto
Myriam
Myriam Hernández
Ninel Conde
Natusha
Obie Bermúdez
Pablo Alborán
Paco Barron
Panda
Paty Cantú
Paulina Rubio
Pedro Fernández
Pete Astudillo
Pilar Montenegro
Plácido Domingo
Plastilina Mosh
Proyecto M
Raphael
RBD
Ricardo Montaner
Selena
Shaila Dúrcal
Soraya
Thalía
Tiziano Ferro
Tony Touch
Toquinho
Verónica Orozco
Vicente Garcia
Vico C
Voces del Rancho
Volumen X
Yaire
Zoé
Robert Fortuna

See also
List of EMI labels
List of Universal Music Group labels

References

External links
Official website (current)
Official EMI Latin website (archive)

 
American record labels
Latin music record labels
Capitol Records
1989 establishments in California
Record labels established in 1989
Universal Music Latin Entertainment
Companies based in Los Angeles